Guy Morton Jr. (November 4, 1930 – May 11, 2014) was a Major League Baseball player.

Morton was the son of the former pitcher Guy Morton, Sr. The younger Morton attended the University of Alabama. In 1954, he was the MVP of the Carolina League Greensboro Patriots.

Morton had a long career in the minor leagues, mostly as a catcher.

After retiring from baseball, Morton became a Baptist minister. After retiring from that career, he wrote a weekly sports column for a local newspaper in Vermilion, Ohio.

See also
List of second-generation Major League Baseball players

References

External links 

Obituary

1930 births
2014 deaths
Sportspeople from Tuscaloosa, Alabama
Baseball players from Alabama
Boston Red Sox players
Marion Red Sox players
Kinston Eagles players
Roanoke Ro-Sox players
Albany Senators players
Greensboro Patriots players
Montgomery Rebels players
Chattanooga Lookouts players
Atlanta Crackers players